Paso inferior is the first full-length studio album by Japanese doom metal band Corrupted. The album is a single track which is approximately 42 minutes long.

The album was originally released on CD by Corrupted's own label Frigidity Discos. It was re-released on vinyl in 2002 and 2008 by Insolito, and again on CD in 2008 by Nostalgia Blackrain.

The title is Spanish for "Underpass". The title is Latin for "Lower Step".

Track listing
Original

12" LP

Personnel
Talbot – guitar
Jose – bass guitar
Chew Hasegawa – drums
Hevi – vocals
Masahiko Ohno – artwork
Ippei Suda – engineering
Ryo Watanabe – engineering

External links

Corrupted (band) albums
1997 debut albums